The following is a list of sporting venues, events, and teams based in  Alaska.

Anchorage

Venues

 Alyeska Resort
Anchorage has many groomed cross-country skiing trails within the urban core.
Mulcahy Stadium
Sullivan Arena
Alaska Airlines Center

Teams
 Anchorage Wolverines
 Anchorage Bucs
 Anchorage Glacier Pilots 
 Alaska-Anchorage Seawolves men's ice hockey
 Rage City Rollergirls
 Arctic Rush (soccer)
 Cook Inlet SC (soccer)
 Pioneer United FC (men's soccer)

Events

 Great Alaska Shootout, an annual NCAA Division I basketball tournament 
 Sadler's Ultra Challenge wheelchair race between Fairbanks and Anchorage
The Tour of Anchorage is an annual  ski race within the city.
 World Eskimo Indian Olympics

Fairbanks

Venues
 Carlson Center

Teams
 Alaska Goldpanners of Fairbanks
 Alaska Nanooks men's ice hockey
 Fairbanks Ice Dogs
 Fairbanks Rollergirls
 Fairbanks SC (soccer)

Events
 Sadler's Ultra Challenge wheelchair race between Fairbanks and Anchorage
 Sonot Kkaazoot
World Eskimo Indian Olympics

Elsewhere

Teams
 MatSu United FC (men's soccer)
 Denali Destroyer Dolls
 Kenai River Brown Bears
 Mat-Su Miners
 Peninsula Oilers

Events
 Alaska Mountain Wilderness Classic
 Arctic Winter Games
 Mount Marathon Race
 World Extreme Skiing Championship

Dog mushing

 Iditarod Trail Sled Dog Race
 Iron Dog
 Junior Iditarod
 Kuskokwim 300
 Tustumena 200
 Yukon Quest

See also
 Alaska Sports Hall of Fame
 List of college athletic programs in Alaska
 List of athletes from Alaska
 Hunting and fishing in Alaska

References

 
Sports in Anchorage, Alaska